Labor Notes is an American non-profit organization and network for rank-and-file union members and grassroots labor activists. Though officially titled the Labor Education and Research Project, the project is best known by the title of its monthly magazine. The magazine reports news and analysis about labor activity or problems facing the labor movement. In its pages it advocates for a revitalization of the labor movement through Social Movement Unionism and union democracy. Labor Notes is based out of Detroit, Michigan, with an East Coast office located in Brooklyn, New York.

Labor Notes is the product of a strategy by labor activists seeking to make grassroots connections across unions and industries.  Labor Notes sought to bridge the gap between isolated rank-and-file caucuses and reform groups (the most notable being Teamsters for a Democratic Union) in major unions such as the Teamsters, the Steelworkers, the United Auto Workers, the Communications Workers of America, the American Federation of Teachers, and others.

History
Labor Notes was launched as an attempt to help further those linkages, following the Bituminous Coal Strike of 1977–1978 and the wide-scale cross-union solidarity and energy it produced.

The hope was that these reform efforts would strengthen and consolidate the more widespread waves of union militancy found earlier in the decade. Headlines in the first year of Labor Notes had themes like, "Teamster Steelhaulers Show Muscle in Three Week Wildcat Strike".

The Reagan-era rollbacks on labor law protections put the labor movement on the defensive. Fledgling rank-and-file groups and Labor Notes began to refocus on how labor leaders seemed incapable of addressing the free fall for unions and working people in this decade.

As the fight against the employers’ offensive gathered force, Labor Notes provided information and arguments over concessions. In 1982, the first Labor Notes conference — Organizing Against Concessions — attracted hundreds of activists. Shortly after, in 1983, Labor Notes published one of its first books, Concessions and How to Beat Them by Jane Slaughter.

Though these trends continued in the 1990s, there were also seen some signs of hope for labor. The AFL-CIO’s leadership changed hands and the federation began devoting more resources to organizing new members, including Latino and other immigrant workers that the labor movement had traditionally ignored. Reformers briefly took control of the Teamsters union and led the 1997 strike at UPS, one of the largest and most successful strikes in recent memory.

Throughout the 1990s, Labor Notes focused on issues like cross-border organizing and free trade. Labor Notes came out strongly against the North American Free Trade Agreement (NAFTA), publishing Unions and Free Trade by Kim Moody and Mary McGinn in 1992.

The year 2000 saw the flowering of the Global Justice Movement at massive protests against corporate globalization in Seattle, Quebec, and around the world. Labor Notes participated in many of these events and supported the union members and global justice activists who formed alliances with these movements. At the same time, Labor Notes was supporting the union victories of the Charleston Five longshore workers and telecommunications workers at Verizon.

In the immediate aftermath of the September 11, 2001 attacks, Labor Notes reported on the massive public employee strike in Minnesota, where workers defied those who called them unpatriotic for striking, demanded a fair contract, and won. As immigrant workers centers grew as new forms of worker self-organization, Labor Notes reported on them and brought together the leaders of those centers to share views at its bi-annual conference.

More recently, Labor Notes reported on the massive immigrant demonstrations for immigrant rights and covered the development of U.S. Labor Against the War.

Books 
Labor Notes has published a number of books on labor-related themes. Its most well-known book is A Troublemaker’s Handbook: How to Fight Back Where You Work and Win by Dan La Botz, in 1991 and its sequel in 2005, A Troublemaker’s Handbook 2 by Jane Slaughter. Another popular book is Democracy is Power, by Mike Parker and Martha Gruelle, printed 1999 and re-released in 2005.

Conferences
Every two years, Labor Notes holds a national conference that attracts over a thousand union members and leaders from across the United States, Canada, Mexico, and abroad. The purpose of these conferences is to help activists build networks based on common issues.

References

External links

 Official website
 CWA News review of A Troublemakers' Handbook

Labor movement in the United States
Political magazines published in the United States
Magazines established in 1979
Workers' rights organizations based in the United States
Magazines published in Detroit
1979 establishments in Michigan
Organizations based in Detroit
Union democracy